Bellaire High School may refer to:

Bellaire High School (Michigan)
Bellaire High School (Ohio), Bellaire, Ohio
Bellaire High School (Texas), Bellaire, Texas (Houston metropolitan area)

See also
 Bel Air High School (disambiguation)
 Belaire High School, Baton Rouge, Louisiana